The Coțatcu is a left tributary of the river Râmnicul Sărat in Romania. It discharges into the Râmnicul Sărat near Vâjâitoarea.

References

Rivers of Romania
Rivers of Vrancea County
Rivers of Buzău County